Jeevanamsam is a 1968 Indian Tamil language drama film, directed and written by Malliyam Rajagopal. The film is based on his play of the same name. It stars Jaishankar and C. R. Vijayakumari, while A. V. M. Rajan, Pushpalatha, Sivakumar, debutante Lakshmi (as a leading actress) and Nagesh playing pivotal roles. The film, released on 21 October 1968, was successful at the box office.

Plot

Cast 
 Jaishankar as Moorthi
 Vijayakumari as Lalitha
 A. V. M. Rajan as Balu
 Pushpalatha as Viji
 Nagesh as Advocate Ramanujam
 Sowcar Janaki as Janaki
 S. V. Subbaiah as Moorthi's uncle
 S. V. Sahasranamam as Lalitha & Balu's father
 Pandari Bai as Meenakshi, Lalitha & Balu's mother
 Sivakumar as Sabapathy
 Lakshmi as Lalitha, Moorthi's sister
 Veerappan as Janu's husband
 Sachu as Janu
 A. K. Veerasami as Lalitha's & Balu's grandpa
 Sundari Bai as Lalitha & Balu's grandmother
K. Vijayan
A. Samikannu as Sabapathi's father

Soundtrack 
Music was by K. V. Mahadevan and lyrics were written by Vaali and Malliyam Rajagopal.

References

External links 
 

1960s Tamil-language films
1968 drama films
1968 films
Films about Indian weddings
Films scored by K. V. Mahadevan
Films set in Chennai
Indian black-and-white films
Indian drama films
Indian films based on plays